Cartilage glycoprotein 39 also called gp-39 or YKL-40
CD40-ligand (TNF ligand superfamily member 5), also called CD40L and gp-39
EMD GP39 locomotive unit also called GP39